Puthiya Aatchi is a 1995 Tamil-language drama film directed by Velu Prabhakaran. The film stars Anandaraj, Raadhika and Sarath Babu. The film songs was composed by Premi - Sreeni and Manachanallur Giridharan, the film score was composed by Shyam and was released on 3 March 1995.

Plot

Marappan (Anandaraj) is the rebel leader of 'Puratchi Padai'. The rebel group only kills corrupted politicians who spoil the poor's lives. Whereas a corrupted politician Valluvadasan (Radha Ravi) misuses their name and he perpetrates murders of innocent people under their name.

Vivekanandan (Sarath Babu), an IPS officer, lives happily with his wife (Raadhika) and his son. Vivekanandan is charged to arrest the members of 'Puratchi Padai'.

Cast

Anandaraj as Marappan
Sarath Babu as Vivekanandhan / Vivek
Raadhika 
Radha Ravi as Valluvadasan 
S. S. Chandran as Kannusamy
S. Gajendra Kumar
V. Gopalakrishnan
Meesai Murugesan
Naga Kannan
Idichapuli Selvaraj
MRK
Velu Prabhakaran as Tamizhmani
Silk Smitha as an item number
Janagaraj as Rajarathnam (guest appearance)
Nirosha in a guest appearance
Rajendran as a goon (uncredited role)

Soundtrack

The film score and the soundtrack were composed by music director Premi - Sreeni and Manachanallur Giridharan. The soundtrack, released in 1995, features 5 tracks with lyrics written by Vairamuthu.

References

1995 films
Indian action drama films
1990s action drama films
1990s Tamil-language films
Indian vigilante films
Films directed by Velu Prabhakaran
1995 drama films